Smallflower buttercup or small-flowered buttercup is a common name for several plants and may refer to:

Ranunculus abortivus
Ranunculus parviflorus